Rostki  is a village in the administrative district of Gmina Troszyn, within Ostrołęka County, Masovian Voivodeship, in east-central Poland. The village has a population of 60.

There are the remains of stone circles in the nearby forest.

References

Villages in Ostrołęka County